The Lancaster, Kentucky Cemetery in Lancaster, Kentucky dates from 1861.  It is enclosed by Campbell, Crab Orchard, and Richmond Streets in Lancaster.  It was listed on the National Register of Historic Places in 1984.  The listing included two contributing buildings and a contributing structure.

A sexton's house was built in 1866, using bricks from the former Old Republican Church which had been built in 1815.  It has a stone receiving vault (1897) which was used to store bodies when grave digging was not possible.  It has an original iron fence and stone entrance pillars, while entrance gates were recent (as of 1984) copies of original gates.

Burials
Notable burials include:
 George W. Dunlap (1813–1880), US Representative
 William J. Landram (1828–1895), Civil War general
 George D. Scott (1850–1886), Indian Wars Medal of Honor recipient (cenotaph)
 Lewis L. Walker (1873–1944), US Representative

References

External links
 

Cemeteries on the National Register of Historic Places in Kentucky
Romanesque Revival architecture in Kentucky
Buildings and structures completed in 1861
National Register of Historic Places in Garrard County, Kentucky
1861 establishments in Kentucky